Big Dick Creek is a stream in Shoshone County, Idaho, in the United States. It is a tributary to the north fork of the Saint Joe River.

See also
List of rivers of Idaho
Long Dick Creek
Unusual place names

References

Rivers of Shoshone County, Idaho
Rivers of Idaho